Zeynep Çelik (born 7 April 1996) is a Turkish Paralympic judoka. She won one of the bronze medals in the women's 57 kg event at the 2020 Summer Paralympics held in Tokyo, Japan.

References 

Living people
1996 births
Turkish female judoka
Paralympic judoka of Turkey
Paralympic bronze medalists for Turkey
Paralympic medalists in judo
Judoka at the 2020 Summer Paralympics
Medalists at the 2020 Summer Paralympics
Sportspeople from Ağrı
21st-century Turkish sportswomen